Mehmed Şevket Eygi (February 7, 1933 – July 12, 2019) was a Turkish journalist, writer, columnist, and Holocaust denier. He had Islamist-nationalist views, including some that were described as antisemitic or conspiracy theories by various sources. Eygi was imprisoned for many years, including for demagoguery in 2002 and 2006.

Biography 
Eygi was born on February 7, 1933, in the Ereğli district of Zonguldak as the only child of his family. He completed his primary, secondary and high school education in Galatasaray High School. Eygi learned French at Galatsaray High School He received a scholarship for Faculty of Political Science, Ankara University in 1952. While attending university, he worked as a translator at the French Cultural Center in Ankara.

After graduating from university in 1956, he worked as a translator at the Directorate of Religious Affairs for two years. After this, he worked as the private secretary of Ömer Nasuhi Bilmen. Eygi began publishing the daily Bugün newspaper in 1966. In February 1969, he made a call for jihad in relation to the anchoring of the US 6th Fleet in Istanbul. This resulted in the "Eygi Bloody Sunday" attack in which two people were killed and 200 people were injured.

Before dying, Eygi donated over 45,000 books to the Presidential Library.

Eygi died in the Istanbul hospital where he was treated for heart disease on July 12, 2019. He was buried in Merkezefendi Cemetery following funeral prayers at Fatih Mosque on July 13, 2019. Attendees  of his burial ceremony included Recep Tayyip Erdoğan (President at the time), Abdulhamit Gül (Minister of Justice at the time), Mustafa Varank (Minister of Industry and Technology at the time) and Temel Karamollaoğlu (chairperson of the Felicity Party at the time.

Criticism 

Eygi is described by H. Esra Arcan as "a renowned Islamist who [wrote] on religious and political subjects". He favoured a political system based on the Sharia, and demanded the rejection of laws that are incompatible with the Quran. Eygi was a Holocaust denier who argued that criminalising Holocaust denial is both a human rights violation and against the freedom of speech principle. Eygi propagated the conspiracy theory that, the English and the Americans have faked the Holocaust by  killing millions of German civilists and soldiers.

Ozan Ekin Gökşin argues that, "rightists such as Mehmet Şevket Eygi (…) were the standard bearers" of the conspiracy theory that, "the cadres who founded the Turkish Republic consisted of the elite of Thessaloniki immigrants who converted from Judaism to Islam, but who secretly performed their own religious rituals." Rıfat Bali outlines that, Eygi spread the conspiracy theory that the group of the Dönme Jews were responsible for the Armenian Genocide, and that Eygi believed that "it wasn't the Muslim Turks who committed [atrocities against the Armenians]". Furthermore, Bali describes Mehmed Şevket Eygi as one of those "political players" and "propagandists" that were responsible for "establishing antisemitism" in post-1946 Turkey. The German Interior Ministry also considered Eygi to be an anti-Semite, who had been spreading the "Dönme Delusions" conspiracy theory since the 1960s. The German Amadeu Antonio Foundation called Eygi's 1999 book Yahudi Türkler yahut Sabetaycilar an "anti-Semitic conspiracy theory book".

Eygi "[depicted Kurds] as non-Muslims that adhere to pagan beliefs". He propagated the conspiracy theory that "[t]here are more than one million Crypto Jews in Turkey", with "some of them" being "Crypto Kurds, Kurdish Jews". In addition to that, Eygi believed that "there are more than one million Crypto Christians in [Turkey]". In his 2005 article "State, Law, Civil Society and Islam in Contemporary Turkey", Ihsan Yilmaz describes that, Eygi also spread Papacy conspiracy theories. He argues that "Whatever topic Eygi [wrote] about in his column, he (…) somewhat fiercely [alleged] that some groups are the secret agents of the Papacy in Turkey." On February 16, 1969, Eygi published an article in the Bugün newspaper entitled "Get Ready for Jihad" in which he claims that a "total war between Muslims and red infidels has become inevitable". Mustafa Yalçıner writes that Eygi is a "Bloody Sunday Instigator". According to Yalçıner, Eygi called upon the Muslim population to fight back against the "red infidels" with their own weapons, which, according to Eygi, were stones, sticks, iron bars, and home-made incendiary grenades. Eygi denied having anything to do with the event.

Eygi was fiercely critical of Fethullah Gülen and the Gülen movement, and wrote much about what he believed their intentions were and which danger he believed they posed to the wellbeing of Turkey.

References

Turkish columnists
1933 births
2019 deaths
People from Karadeniz Ereğli
20th-century Turkish writers
21st-century Turkish writers
Galatasaray High School alumni
Ankara University Faculty of Political Sciences alumni
Turkish conspiracy theorists
Holocaust deniers